Joy to the World: A Christmas Collection by Lincoln Brewster is the eighth studio album, and first ever Christmas release recorded by contemporary worship musician Lincoln Brewster. The album was produced by Brewster along with Colby Wedgeworth, and it was released by Integrity Music. The album has seen commercial charting successes and positive critical attention.

Background and release 

The album was released on October 9, 2012 by Integrity Music, and it was produced by Lincoln Brewster and Colby Wedgeworth. This was the first Christmas album by Brewster.

Critical reception 

Joy to the World: A Christmas Collection garnered universally positive critical reception from music critics. At Worship Leader, they rated the album three-and-a-half stars, and said all the classic hallmarks of a Lincoln Brewster album are on the album with the Christmas elements in tow. Elliot Rose of Cross Rhythms rated the album a seven out of ten, and wrote that the album ended well. At Jesus Freak Hideout, Bert Gangl rated the album three-and-a-half stars, and alluded to how the album has some setbacks yet it comes "loaded with more wheat than chaff." Jonathan Andre of Indie Vision Music rated the album four stars, and proclaimed the album to be "certainly joyful".

At New Release Tuesday, Mary Nikkel rated the album four stars, and wrote that "Although the album draws wholly on already established songs, it does so with a lack of pretension and an enthusiastic tone which sinks into each selection." Kelly Sheads of New Release Tuesday rated the album four stars, and noted that the album makes a worthy contribution to Christmas projects. At Christian Music Zine, Joshua Andre rated the album four-and-a-half stars, and proclaimed it to be a "sublime and near-flawless effort!"

Track listing

Charts

Personnel 

 Lincoln Brewster – lead and backing vocals, guitars, keyboards, programming, bass, drums, arrangements
 Colby Wedgeworth – guitars, keyboards, programming, bass, drums, arrangements, backing vocals
 Steve Padilla – keyboards
 Roman Vysochin – keyboards
 Kip Johns – bass
 Mike Johns – drums
 Peter Burton – gang vocals
 Kelly Caldwell – gang vocals
 Tyler DeYoung – gang vocals
 Rachel Jackson – gang vocals
 Corbin Phillips – gang vocals
 Margie Ruiz – gang vocals
 Sarah Sherratt – gang vocals

Production
 Lincoln Brewster – producer, engineer
 Colby Wedgeworth – producer, engineer, mixing, mastering
 Michael Coleman – executive producer
 C. Ryan Dunham – executive producer
 Chico Gonzalez	- A&R
 Tyler DeYoung – assistant engineer
 Mike Johns – assistant engineer
 Wilson Wedgeworth – assistant engineer
 Brandon Yip – assistant engineer
 Dave Taylor – production coordination
 Thom Hoyman – creative director
 Jeremy Cowart – photography
 Ben DeRienzo – art direction, design

References

2012 Christmas albums
Christmas albums by American artists
Lincoln Brewster albums